Gilg is a surname. Notable people with the surname include:

Candice Gilg (born 1972), French freestyle skier
Deborah R. Gilg (born 1951), American lawyer
Ernest Friedrich Gilg (1867–1933), German botanist
Karl Gilg (1901–1981), German chess player

See also
Charlotte Gilg-Benedict (1872-1965), German botanist, wife of Ernest Friedrich